The following is a list of covered sports stadiums, ordered by capacity; that is the maximum number spectators the stadium can accommodate for a sports event. This is intended to include only stadiums that are used for sports traditionally held outdoors. It is split into two sublists:
 Stadiums designed for field sports, such as baseball and any of a wide variety of football codes, and/or athletics (track and field).
 Tennis stadiums (a traditional outdoor sport, but with a much smaller playing area)

Only domed and retractable roof stadiums are included, i.e. stadiums that cover both spectators and playing field. Wembley Stadium in London, which seats 90,000 spectators, is not included as the roof can only be partially closed. The stadiums are divided into current stadiums, closed stadiums, and future stadiums (those currently under-construction and those planned for construction).

Indoor arenas should not be included on this list as there is a separate list for them.

Current stadiums

Field sports

Tennis/ other

Closed and demolished stadiums

Field Sports
(All of these were domed)

Defunct and Demolished Stadiums

Formerly Covered Stadiums

Tennis/ other

Future Stadiums

Under Construction

Field Sports

Planned

Tennis

See also
 List of stadiums by capacity
 List of world's largest domes

References

Lists of stadiums

Lists of sports venues with capacity